Herbert Arnoldo Sosa Burgos (born January 11, 1990 in San Salvador) is a Salvadoran professional footballer who plays as a midfielder.

Club career
Sosa's professional career began in July 2007, when he signed a contract with Chalatenango. He officially made his debut on September 23, 2007, in a league match against Once Municipal.

International career
Sosa made his debut for El Salvador in an October 2010 friendly match against Panama and scored his first goal in friendly against Venezuela from a free kick.

His team ended up winning the game 2–1 with a late goal from Edwin Sánchez. Sosa also made history by scoring El Salvador's 1000th international goal in his penalty kick against the Cayman Islands.

He has, as of February 2012, earned a total of 7 caps, scoring 2 goals and has represented his country in 3 FIFA World Cup qualification matches and played at the 2011 UNCAF Nations Cup.

International goals

Career statistics

Club
As of 7 February 2009.

References

1990 births
Living people
Sportspeople from San Salvador
Association football midfielders
Salvadoran footballers
El Salvador international footballers
C.D. Chalatenango footballers
Alianza F.C. footballers
2011 Copa Centroamericana players
2013 Copa Centroamericana players
2017 Copa Centroamericana players
2009 CONCACAF U-20 Championship players